The Preventing and Combating Violence Against Women and Domestic Violence (Ratification of Convention) Act 2017 (c. 18) is an act of the Parliament of the United Kingdom. The act made provisions for the ratification of the Istanbul Convention and set out a reporting process for the Secretary of State. It was introduced to Parliament as a private members bill by Eilidh Whiteford and Baroness Gale.

Provisions
The provisions of the act include:
Ensuring that, as soon as reasonably practicable after the Act was passed, the Secretary of State would be required to report to Parliament the steps needed to be taken for and the timescale within which the Istanbul Convention's ratification could be achieved.

Ensuring that every year until ratification the Secretary of State reports to Parliament any alterations to the timescale of ratification, the measures taken by the government towards ratification and the measures still needed before ratification.

That such a report should be given to Parliament no later than the 1 November each year.

Timetable

Through the Commons
The Bill had its first reading in the House of Commons on the 29 June 2016 and its second reading on the 16 December 2016. The committee stage started on the 1 February and the committee reported on the 24 February. The Bill passed its third reading the same day with no amendments.

Through the Lords and royal assent
The Bill had its first reading on the 27 February 2017 and its second reading on the 10 March. The committee stage began on 28 March and the Bill had its third reading on the 6 April. The Bill gained royal assent on 27 April 2017.

Amendments
As of June 2019, there have been no amendments to the Act.

References

United Kingdom Acts of Parliament 2017
Law of the United Kingdom
Women's rights
Violence against women in Europe
2017 in British law